Charlie Bisharat (born March 15, 1963) is an American violinist known as a member of Shadowfax and for his work in film and with other New Age Jazz artists. He was born in Inglewood, CA in 1963 to parents who immigrated to the United States from Palestine in the 1950s.

Bisharat was a member of the band Shadowfax which won the Best New Age Performance Grammy Award in 1988 for the album Folksongs for a Nuclear Village. He has toured with Yanni during the Reflections of Passion, Revolution in Sound, Dare to Dream and Yanni Live, The Symphony Concerts 1993 concert tours

He is also featured on John Tesh's live concert video Live at Red Rocks. Bisharat accompanied Tesh in live shows as  co-writer and co-producer.

Bisharat's work can be heard in more than 200 recordings, including Elton John, the Rolling Stones, Aerosmith, Jane's Addiction and Lady Gaga's album Chromatica. He is also in demand as a session musician on soundtracks such as Swordfish, The Mandalorian, Aquaman, Rogue One: A Star Wars Story, and many Pixar films. He also featured in the music of Michael Giacchino's Ratatouille the Ride at Disneyland Paris.

Bisharat has written and recorded a jazz improvisational book and album, Beyond Classical Violi for Cherry Lane Music. In 2015, he collaborated with composer-arranger Marti Amado on the gypsy swing album Les Nouveaux Bohemiens, featuring an ensemble that includes the likes of John Jorgenson.

Discography
Along the Amazon (1993), with Strunz & Farah, Don Grusin, Russell Ferrante, John Patitucci, Eric Marienthal, and Shadowfax alumni Chuck Greenberg
Les Nouveaux Bohemiens With composer Marti Amado and composer/producer Josquin Des Pres (20th century musician)

References

External links

 

1963 births
Living people
Musicians from Inglewood, California
American male violinists
Grammy Award winners
American people of Iranian descent
21st-century American violinists
21st-century American male musicians
Shadowfax (band) members